David Geoffrey Trubridge  is a furniture designer based in Whakatu, New Zealand.

Background 

Trubridge graduated from Newcastle University in England in 1972 with a degree in Naval Architecture (Boat Design). Working as a forester in rural Northumberland for the next ten years, he taught himself to make furniture. His carefully crafted designs were shown all over the UK, including at the Victoria and Albert Museum and St. Mary's Cathedral in Edinburgh.

Encapsulating his ethos, Trubridge says that he "...works within the limits of what I have and know, simplicity and low impact, natural materials and processes, leaving a delicate footprint."

Awards and exhibitions 

Trubridge has exhibited his work extensively throughout the world and can be found in private and public collections, key design stores and museums including the Victoria and Albert Museum. In 2012, the Pompidou Centre in Paris acquired two elements of the Icarus Light installation, Wing and Sola, for their permanent collection.

The company exhibited at Dwell on Design (LA) and Wanted Design (NY) in 2011. It was also part of the 2010 Smithsonian Cooper Hewitt Design National Design Triennial, one of America's most prestigious collections of innovative designs.
This international presence has been consolidated by the company's involvement with the Milan Furniture Fair since 2006.  In conjunction with the Natural Art Museum and the UN, Trubridge exhibited "On Thin Ice" in 2007 at the Nobel Peace Centre. Shown in Oslo, Brussels, Monaco and Chicago, this sculptural investigation into climate change won Trubridge a Green Leaf Award. This is in addition to numerous other shows and fairs which are regularly attended.

In New Zealand, BEST, Good Design and the NZ Home Design Awards have been acquired.  In 2007, Trubridge also received the John Britten Award, which is New Zealand's highest design accolade.

Trubridge has taught and lectured at a broad range of institutions. This includes regular summer school sessions at Vitra Design Museum (France), a "Distinguished Visiting Professor of Wood Arts" award at San Francisco's CCA, and as a speaker at the Arquine Architectural Institute in Mexico. With a strong belief in educating and encouraging the next generation of designers, Trubridge also employs interns on a regular basis.

Martin Sidoruk, speaking for the DINZ Council, said, "David is a true advocate of New Zealand's design industry, speaking regularly overseas and mentoring young designers, while at the same time achieving international success and recognition for his incredible designs."

In the 2019 Queen's Birthday Honours, Trubridge was appointed an Officer of the New Zealand Order of Merit, for services to design.

Notable works 

Flora, fauna and formations within landscapes mainly comprises Trubridge's work. These include lighting, furniture, large scale commissions and sculptural pieces which are all designed with longevity in mind and integrity at their core.

Perhaps one of the most well known Trubridge "signatures" is the Coral Light. Inspired by the designer's experiences underwater, the piece is based on the structure of a geometric polyhedron and is reminiscent of the intricate patterns within coral itself. Sold as a kitset, the environmental footprint of the light is also reduced. This is a typical Trubridge feature. The collections incorporate a wide range of  "Grow"  lights which are known as the "Seed System". The company believes this involvement of the customer in the construction process is an essential advancement of the product's emotional worth.

Trubridge's body of work has continued to develop since his early days as a craftsman in the UK.  In 2008, Body Raft was designed for New Zealand exhibition "Furniture in Context", which was an initiative of the Hawke's Bay Cultural Trust. Later taken to the Dowse Art Museum, this piece was further developed in 2001 and shown at the Milan Furniture Fair. It was Body Raft which propelled Trubridge onto the international design circuit with the piece's design purchased by Italian company Cappellini. Constructed from a process involving steam bent timber, the piece was featured in the book Eco Design – The Source Book and described as "...local Wych Elm (sic) is bent...to create a frame to which further curved lathes are attached. This organic shape is visually appealing"(1). This piece is now held by Te Papa Museum.

A regular presence in the US and European design markets, Trubridge has also developed a number of large scale commissions for corporate clients. These include a series of lights for Topshop's flagship store in Oxford Street for the launch of the Kate Moss collection; for Stella McCartney in Printemps (Paris); benches for Suncorp HQ (Brisbane) and the AMP foyer (Auckland); customised lights for Oroton (in all Australian stores); and sculptural light installations for Bombay Sapphire's pop up shop in Auckland.

A collaborative project with Urban Arts Projects resulted in a lighting installation for the Westfield Fox Hills Shopping Centre in California. In addition, Trubridge has work in The Minneapolis Museum (Glide), Auckland Museum (Pacific Chair) and in the Powerhouse, Sydney (Sling).

Most recently, the Pompidou Centre in Paris has purchased Trubridge's Icarus installation (two Wing and one Sola light) for its permanent collection.

References 

 Helen Schamroth, 100 New Zealand Craft Artists (Auckland: Godwit Press, 1998) 
 Alastair Fuad-Luke, eco-Design: The Sourcebook (Chronicle Books, 2006)  (Trubridge is on cover)

External links 
 
 Works in the collection of the Pompidou Centre
 Entries on website for Museum of New Zealand Te Papa Tongarewa
 Episode of 95bFM documentary series, Seeded
 entry on Design Within Reach website

Year of birth missing (living people)
Living people
New Zealand furniture designers
English emigrants to New Zealand
Officers of the New Zealand Order of Merit
Alumni of Newcastle University